Oliver Daniel Hanrahan (born 27 August 1998) is a professional Australian rules football player who most recently played with the Hawthorn Football Club in the Australian Football League (AFL). Hanrahan was recruited to Hawthorn with selection 14 in the 2017 AFL rookie draft.

Early life
Hanrahan was born in Fitzroy, Victoria where he then grew up in Brighton East. In his earlier days he was very well known for his cricket abilities, being a talented all rounder for the St Kevin's College  1st XI as well as playing for the Melbourne Cricket Club in the Victorian Premier Cricket competition. Hanrahan was drafted straight from school football in the APS competition after quitting the Sandringham Dragons (TAC cup) due to cricket commitments. He played for St Kevin's College 1st XVIII where he made his debut as a 15 year old.

AFL career
The small forward began to learn the craft at VFL level and finished with 19 goals for the season. His goal in the dying seconds of the elimination final against Port Melbourne gave the win for the Hawks. Three weeks later they were premiers.

Hanrahan made his AFL debut in round 15, 2019, against  at the MCG. He kicked a goal in his debut match. Hanrahan played well enough to hold his spot in the team for the rest of the season. He was elevated at the end of the season onto the main list. Following the 2021 season, Hanrahan was told by Hawthorn that he would have to wait until the end of the trade period to see if he would get another contract. Hanrahan would be delisted by Hawthorn on 15 October 2021.

At the Start of the 2022 season he was added to the Sydney Swans top-up list.

Statistics
Statistics are correct to the end of 2021.

|- style=background:#EAEAEA
| 2017 ||  || 41
| 0 || — || — || — || — || — || — || — || — || — || — || — || — || — || — || 0
|-
| 2018 ||  || 41
| 0 || — || — || — || — || — || — || — || — || — || — || — || — || — || — || 0
|- style=background:#EAEAEA
| 2019 ||  || 41
| 9 || 7 || 4 || 68 || 50 || 118 || 27 || 9 || 0.8 || 0.4 || 7.6 || 5.6 || 13.1 || 3.0 || 1.0 || 0
|-
| 2020 ||  || 41
| 7 || 3 || 4 || 44 || 31 || 75 || 10 || 7 || 0.4 || 0.6 || 6.3 || 4.4 || 10.7 || 1.4 || 1.0 || 0
|- style=background:#EAEAEA
| 2021 ||  || 13
| 13 || 8 || 6 || 71 || 70 || 141 || 31 || 13 || 0.6 || 0.5 || 5.5 || 5.4 || 10.8 || 2.4 || 1.0 || 0
|- class="sortbottom"
! colspan=3| Career
! 29 !! 18 !! 14 !! 183 !! 151 !! 334 !! 68 !! 29 !! 0.6 !! 0.5 !! 6.3 !! 5.2 !! 11.5 !! 2.3 !! 1.0 !! 0
|}

Notes

Honours and achievements
Team
 VFL premiership player: 2018

Individual
  best first year player (debut season): 2019

References

External links

Living people
1998 births
Australian rules footballers from Victoria (Australia)
Sandringham Dragons players
Box Hill Football Club players
Hawthorn Football Club players